Lâm Tấn Phác, pen name Đông Hồ (Đông Hồ, 10 March 1906 - 25 March 1969) was a Vietnamese poet and journalist. He was employed as a writer on the Saigon newspaper Đông Pháp Thời Báo during the 1920s. He was married to the poet Mộng Tuyết.

References

Vietnamese journalists
Vietnamese male poets
1906 births
1969 deaths
20th-century Vietnamese poets
20th-century male writers
20th-century journalists